William Esselstyne Lansing (December 29, 1821 – July 29, 1883) was a U.S. Representative from New York during the American Civil War.

Biography
Born in Perryville, New York, Lansing attended the common schools.
He graduated from Cazenovia Seminary in 1841.
He studied law in Utica, New York.
He was admitted to the bar in 1845 and commenced practice in Chittenango.
He served as district attorney of Madison County in 1850–1853.
He served as president of the village of Chittenango in 1853–1855.
County clerk in 1855–1858.

Lansing was elected as a Republican to the Thirty-seventh Congress (March 4, 1861 – March 3, 1863).
He was not a candidate for renomination in 1862.

Lansing was elected to the Forty-second and Forty-third Congresses (March 4, 1871 – March 3, 1875).
He was not a candidate for renomination.
He resumed the practice of law in Syracuse, New York, in 1876 and died there July 29, 1883.
He was interred in Oakwood Cemetery, Chittenango, New York.

References
 Retrieved on 2009-04-29

1821 births
1883 deaths
Cazenovia College alumni
People of New York (state) in the American Civil War
Republican Party members of the United States House of Representatives from New York (state)
19th-century American politicians